"Come as You Are" is the lead single from English singer Beverley Knight's fourth studio album, Affirmation (2004). Co-written by Guy Chambers, it was Knight's second UK top-10 hit and is her highest-charting song in the UK, peaking at number nine and remaining in the UK top 75 for 10 weeks. It also briefly charted in Germany, peaking at number 100.

Music video
The promotional video for "Come as You Are" was directed by J.T and was Knight's most expensive. It is set on a futuristic space station and involves her performing with her band to a large crowd.

Track listings
UK CD1
 "Come as You Are"
 "Shoulda Woulda Coulda"

UK CD2
 "Come as You Are"
 "Relate"
 "Come as You Are" (JD remix)
 "Come as You Are" (video)

UK 12-inch single
A. "Come as You Are" (JD remix)
B. "Come as You Are"

Credits and personnel
Credits are adapted from the European CD1 liner notes.

Studios
 Recorded at Townhouse Studios and Orgasmatron Studio (London, UK)
 Mixed at Mayfair Studios (London)

Personnel
 Beverley Knight – writing, vocals
 Guy Chambers – writing, production, arranging
 Richard Flack – production, engineering, mixing
 Paul Stanborough – engineering assistant
 Traffic – artwork design
 Deirdre O'Callaghan – photography

Charts

References

2004 singles
2004 songs
Beverley Knight songs
Parlophone singles
Song recordings produced by Guy Chambers
Songs written by Beverley Knight
Songs written by Guy Chambers